Haidamatske can mean
 Haidamatske, Dnipropetrovsk Oblast, a rural locality in Dnipropetrovsk Oblast, Ukraine
 Haidamatske, the former name of the urban-type settlement of Arbuzynka, Mykolaiv Oblast, Ukraine